Vinicius Bacaro (born 20 August 1978), is an Italian–Brazilian futsal player who plays for Latina as an Ala.

Vinicius Bácaro was a member of the Italian national futsal team.

Honours
2 leagues (05/06, 06/07)
2 Copas de España (2008, 2009)
2 Supercopas de España (2006, 2009)
1 UEFA Futsal Cup (2009)
1 Cup of Brazil (2001)
2 Coppa Italia (2003, 2011)
1 Copa Ibérica (2007)
1 UEFA Futsal Championship (2003)
1 MVP UEFA Futsal Championship  2003
1 best Ala-Pívot of the LNFS (05/06)

References

External links
lnfs.es profile
Futsalplanet profile

1978 births
Sportspeople from São Paulo
Living people
Italian men's futsal players
ElPozo Murcia FS players
Inter FS players
S.S. Lazio Calcio a 5 players
Brazilian emigrants to Italy